Amy Hunter (born May 6, 1966) is an American actress and model. She has had roles on a number of television series and daytime soaps. She co-hosted The Comedy Channel's Night After Night, and went on location for ESPN's Women in Sports.

Hunter was a special guest host on Soul Train, the weekly series where she met her husband, Tony Cornelius, son of creator-producer Don Cornelius. They had a daughter, Christina Marie, and later divorced.

Her theater work includes the starring role of Maria in West Side Story, Beneathea in A Raisin in the Sun, and the green-eyed sister in Words of Women.

Hunter's twelve years of experience in modeling took her to New York City and all over Europe. She also appeared in a number of commercials, including for Miller, Chevrolet and Reebok.

Filmography

Film

Television

Games
 RAMA (1996), based on the books of Arthur C. Clarke and Gentry Lee. Hunter played the role of Nicole des Jardins.

References

External links
 
 Bio at pacificblue.com

1966 births
African-American female models
Female models from Massachusetts
African-American models
American film actresses
Living people
Actresses from Boston
African-American actresses
American television actresses
21st-century African-American people
21st-century African-American women
20th-century African-American people
20th-century African-American women